Courrensan is a commune in the Gers department in southwestern France.

Geography
The Auzoue forms part of the commune's southern border, then flows north-northwest through the middle of the commune.

The village lies in the middle of the commune, on the right bank of the Auzoue.

Population

See also
Communes of the Gers department

References

Communes of Gers